Thomas Evans Stern,  (born December 16, 1946) is an American cinematographer. He is best known for his work on films directed by Clint Eastwood, having been his primary cinematographer since Blood Work in 2002. Stern began work as a gaffer in 1977, and for his work in Changeling (2008) was nominated for an Academy Award for Best Cinematography.

Filmography

As director

References

External links

Tom Stern at AFC
Kodak OnFilm interview
AFC interview

1946 births
American cinematographers
Living people
Palo Alto High School alumni
People from Palo Alto, California